Shooter is a 1988 American made-for-television action drama film based on the book Shooter by and about Pulitzer Prize-winning photographer David Hume Kennerly, who had been a combat photojournalist during the Vietnam War and later the White House photographer for President Gerald Ford. The film was produced as a pilot which was not picked up as a series by NBC and originally aired on September 11, 1988.

Summary
The film followed the adventures in Vietnam of a fictional photo journalist named Matt Thompson, played by Jeffrey Nordling in his debut role.

It was made shortly after Good Morning Vietnam had been a success in theaters, and it borrowed two actors from the Good Morning Vietnam cast, Noble Willingham and Cu Ba Nguyen, as well as having a similar free-spirited protagonist who is constantly clashing with his superiors.

The television pilot was filmed on location in Thailand. David Hume Kennerly served as executive producer and writer. Gary Nelson directed the film.

Cast
 Jeffrey Nordling as Matt Thompson / Grunwald
 Noble Willingham as Rizzo
 Kario Salem as Rene
 Helen Hunt as Tracey
 Alan Ruck as Stork O'Connor
 Jerry Alan Chandler as Klaus
 Carol Huston as Cat
 Rosalind Chao as Lan
 Nick Cassavetes as Tex
 Grace Zabriskie as Sister Marie		
 Adrian Paul as Ian
 Louis Roth as Garth Andrews
 Steven Ford as Capt. Walker

Awards
Shooter won an Emmy for cinematography.

References

External links
 

1988 television films
1988 films
1980s action drama films
American action drama films
NBC network original films
Television films as pilots
Television pilots not picked up as a series
Films directed by Gary Nelson
Films scored by Paul Chihara
1980s English-language films
1980s American films